The Papanasam dam also known as Karaiyar Dam is located  away from Tirunelveli in Tamil Nadu, India. The dam is used to irrigate  of paddy fields in Tirunelveli and Tuticorin districts.

Papanasam Hydroelectric Power Plant
Papanasam Hydroelectric Power Plant has a design capacity of 28 megawatts. It has four Francis turbine-generators. The first unit was commissioned in 1944 and the last in 1951. It is on Thambirabarani river. It is operated by Tamil Nadu Generation and Distribution Corporation Limited (TANGEDCO).

References

Dams in Tamil Nadu
Tirunelveli district
Hydroelectric power stations in Tamil Nadu
Dams completed in 1942
1942 establishments in India
20th-century architecture in India